The Democratic Union of the Malian People (UDPM) was a military-backed political party in Mali. Its main organ was the daily newspaper L'Essor – La Voix du Peuple, which had a circulation of 40,000. It was the largest newspaper in the country during the mid-1980s.

History
The party was founded by the CMLN military junta in order to provide the regime with political legitimacy. Moussa Traoré announced the party's formation on 22 September 1975, with himself as general secretary.  Upon the restoration of civilian rule in 1979, it became the only legal party in Mali.

The UDPM organized itself along the Marxist–Leninist principle of democratic centralism. However, as with many other African socialist parties, it did not identify itself as Marxist due to the perceived association between Marxism and atheism; the Malian political elite was mostly Muslim, and Muslim religious leaders played a key role in the independence movement. UDPM had a Central Executive Bureau with 19 members and a National Council with 137 members. As the party's general secretary, Traoré was the only candidate for president of the republic. He was automatically elected for a six-year term and confirmed in office in the 1979 general elections, whilst voters were presented with a single list of UDPM candidates for the National Assembly. This was repeated in elections in 1982, 1985 and 1988.

Following a coup by Amadou Toumani Touré in 1991, the party was dissolved in the same year.

Electoral history

Presidential Elections

National Assembly elections

References 

Defunct political parties in Mali
Political parties established in 1975
Political parties disestablished in 1991
Parties of one-party systems
Socialism in Mali
Banned socialist parties